Playlist Your Way may refer to:

 Playlist Your Way (DMX album), 2009
 Playlist Your Way (Jodeci album), 2008
 Playlist Your Way (K-Ci & JoJo album), 2008